Francisco "Fran" Martínez García (born September 9, 1995 in Elche, Spain) is a Spanish footballer who currently plays for Orihuela.

Career

Professional
After spending time in Spain with Valencia B and Real Murcia, Martínez trialled with MLS side New York City FC. However, he later signed with NYCFC's United Soccer League affiliate club Wilmington Hammerheads on April 22, 2015.

References

External links
 

1995 births
Living people
Spanish footballers
Spanish expatriate footballers
Expatriate soccer players in the United States
Wilmington Hammerheads FC players
USL Championship players
Association football defenders